Joaquín Ruiz Lorente (born April 14, 1966) is a retired Spanish professional basketball player and the current manager of the Liaoning Flying Leopards.

Player career
The career of Ruiz Lorente began with CB Zaragoza, with players like José Luis Llorente or Pepe Arcega. In 1991, he left the team of his born city for playing with other Liga ACB teams. He totally spent 18 seasons in the league, playing 453 games.

Honors
Copa del Rey: (2)
1984, 1990

Coaching career
Ruiz Lorente started his career as assistant coach of José Luis Abós at CAI Zaragoza during four seasons, becoming the head coach in August 2014, when Abós resigned due an illness. He was sacked in November 2015 after an awful start of the 2015–16 season.

On 31 March 2016, Ruiz Lorente was appointed as head coach of the Panama men's national basketball team.

Six months later, Ruiz Lorente agreed terms with Chinese league team Liaoning Flying Leopards, but despite this contract, he will continue being the Panamese national team coach.

References

External links
ACB profile as player
ACB profile as manager 
Eurocup Basketball profile

1966 births
Living people
Baloncesto Málaga players
CB Gran Canaria players
CB Breogán players
CB Zaragoza players
Liga ACB players
Spanish men's basketball players
Spanish basketball coaches
Sportspeople from Zaragoza
Valencia Basket players
Liga ACB head coaches
CB Peñas Huesca players
Cantabria Baloncesto players
Point guards